The 2016–17 Euro Hockey Tour is the 21st season of Euro Hockey Tour. It started on 3 November 2016 and lasted until 30 April 2017. It consisted of Karjala Tournament, Channel One Cup, Sweden Hockey Games and Czech Hockey Games.

Total standings

Karjala Tournament

The Karjala Cup was played between 3–6 November 2016. Five of the matches were played in Helsinki, Finland, and one match in Plzeň, Czech Republic. Tournament was won by Russia.

Channel One Cup

The Channel One Cup was played between 15–18 December 2016. Five of the matches were played in Russia, and one match in Helsinki, Finland. Tournament was won by Sweden.

Sweden Hockey Games

The 2017 Sweden Hockey Games was played between 9–12 February 2017. Five of the matches are played in Gothenburg, Sweden, and one match in Saint Petersburg, Russia.

Czech Hockey Games

The 2017 Czech Hockey Games was played between 27–30 April 2017. Five of the matches are played in České Budějovice, Czech Republic, and one match in Stockholm, Sweden.

External links
 European Hockey Tour on Eurohockey.com

 
Euro Hockey Tour
2016–17 in European ice hockey